This page presents the discography of the French pop singer Jeanne Mas.

Albums

Studio albums

Live albums

Compilations

Singles

Videos
 En concert (1987)
 Tous mes clips (1990)
 Depuis la toute première fois (1991)

References

External links
 Official website

Discographies of French artists
Pop music discographies